Shalgi may refer to:
Ilan Shalgi (b. 1945), Israeli politician
Shalgi, Iran, a village in Khuzestan Province, Iran